The following list includes notable people who were born or have lived in Pawtucket, Rhode Island.

Academics and scientists 

 Aram Chobanian, cardiologist; ninth president of Boston University; born in Pawtucket
 Joel Garreau, journalist, editor and author (editor at The Washington Post)
 Martha Mitchell, author and longtime archivist at Brown University
 Minton Warren, scholar and Latin professor at Harvard University; born in Pawtucket

Architecture 

 James C. Bucklin (1801–1890), born in Pawtucket, became prominent Providence architect
 Charles E. Carpenter (1845–1923), born in Pawtucket, became partner in Stone, Carpenter & Willson of Providence
 C. Willis Damon (1850–1916), born in Pawtucket, became leading architect of Haverhill, Massachusetts
 Raymond Hood (1881–1934), born in Pawtucket, architect of Rockefeller Center and Tribune Tower
 Edwin L. Howland (1838–1876), born in Pawtucket, noted Providence architect
 Albert H. Humes (1867–1947), born in Pawtucket, became the city's leading 19th-century architect
 Lloyd W. Kent (1907–1991), born in Pawtucket, became prominent Providence architect
 R. C. N. Monahan (died 1963), leading 20th-century Pawtucket architect
 Edward I. Nickerson (1845–1908), born in Pawtucket, became architect in Providence
 John F. O'Malley, practiced in Pawtucket from 1919, designed City Hall

Arts and culture 

 Don Bousquet, cartoonist
 Wendy Carlos, musician
 Galway Kinnell, poet
 Armand LaMontagne, sculptor
 Abraham Nathanson (1929–2010), graphic designer; developer of Bananagrams; born in Pawtucket
 Sam Patch, daredevil 
 Anne Morgan Spalter, artist
 Herb Weiss, Arts District Overseerer
 Gary Whitehead, poet and painter

Business 

 Samuel Slater, industrialist; considered "Father of the American Industrial Revolution" by US president Andrew Jackson; lived in Pawtucket
 The Hassenfeld Brothers creates Hasbro Toys while living in Pawtucket

Film and TV 

 Ruth Clifford, silent film star
 Michael Corrente, independent film director
 Alice Drummond, actress
 Jack Duffy, actor
 David Hartman, television personality
 Kevin Lima, film director

Ecology 
 David M. Rosser, environmentalist

Journalism 

 Irving R. Levine, journalist and foreign correspondent
 Al Rockoff, photojournalist

Music 

 Wendy Carlos, composer and electronic musician
 Rosario Mazzeo, clarinetist
 David Rawlings, musician
 Jon B, musician and singer

Politics 

 Lincoln Almond, 72nd Governor of Rhode Island; born in Pawtucket
 Mary-Ann Baldwin, Mayor of Raleigh, North Carolina; born in Pawtucket
 Willard L. Beaulac, U.S. Ambassador to Paraguay, Colombia, Cuba, Chile and Argentina; born in Pawtucket
 David Carlin, author and politician: majority leader of RI Senate (1989–1990); born and grew up in Pawtucket
 Thomas Gardiner Corcoran, presidential advisor to Franklin D. Roosevelt and Lyndon B. Johnson; born in Pawtucket
 John W. Davis, 38th and 41st Governor of Rhode Island
 Joseph L. Fisher, U.S. Representative from Virginia's 10th congressional district; born in Pawtucket
 Louis Monast, U.S. Representative from Rhode Island; immigrated to Pawtucket from Quebec, Canada as a child
 Samuel Starkweather, 7th Mayor of Cleveland; born in Pawtucket

Religion

 Susan Hammond Barney (1834–1922), evangelist

Sports

Baseball 

 Louise Arnold, player in All-American Girls Professional Baseball League; born in Pawtucket
 John LaRose, pitcher for the Boston Red Sox; born in Pawtucket
 Chet Nichols Jr., pitcher for the Boston/Milwaukee Braves, Boston Red Sox, and Cincinnati Reds; born in Pawtucket
 Ken Ryan, pitcher for the Boston Red Sox and Philadelphia Phillies; born in Pawtucket

Basketball 

 Ernie Calverley, point guard for the Providence Steamrollers; born in Pawtucket
 Rakim Sanders, shooting guard for Hapoel Gilboa Galil in Israel; born in Pawtucket
 Azurá Stevens, forward for the Dallas Wings; born in Pawtucket
 Jeff Xavier, point and shooting guard with four teams in the Spanish LEB Oro league; born in Pawtucket

Boxing 

 Peter Manfredo Jr., middleweight boxer (held multiple titles); trained at his family's gym in Pawtucket

Football 

 Charles Avedisian, Providence College football captain, 1940; inducted into PC Hall of Fame, 1972; guard, New York Giants 1942–1944; William E. Tolman High School graduate, 1936
 Gerry Philbin, defensive end for the New York Jets, Philadelphia Eagles and Charlotte Hornets (WFL); born in Pawtucket
 Hank Soar, running and defensive back for the New York Giants; Major League Baseball umpire; died in Pawtucket

Horse racing 

 Red Pollard, jockey best known for riding Seabiscuit; founding member of the Jockeys' Guild (1940); died in Pawtucket

Hockey 

 Keith Carney, former NHL defenseman who is from Pawtucket, played in the NHL from 1992–2009, also played for team USA's men's hockey team in the 1998 Olympics

Olympics 

 Janet Moreau, track-and-field athlete, 1952 Summer Olympics gold medalist; born in Pawtucket

Running 

 Les Pawson, 3-time Boston Marathon winner; born in Pawtucket

Wrestling 

 Tim White, referee and producer with the World Wrestling Entertainment (WWE)
 Tiny the Terrible, wrestler and politician who ran for Pawtucket mayor in 2006

Track & Field 

 Robert Howard, 9-time NCAA champion in triple jump/long jump

References

Pawtucket
People